Matarazzo Building (Portuguese: Edifício Matarazzo), also known as Palácio do Anhangabaú (Anhangabaú Palace) is the city hall of the city of São Paulo, Brazil. It belonged to Banespa until 2004, when it was sold to the city government. The building's architectural style looks like Art Deco.

According to the deal made with Banespa, the building would be given to the city government as part of the debt of 885 million reais (some 466 million dollars) that the extinct CMTC had with the bank. The city would then owe 156 million reais, to be paid in four years.

References 

Buildings and structures in São Paulo
Tourist attractions in São Paulo
City and town halls in Brazil